Francesco Gotti (18 September 1923 – 4 July 1996) was an Italian rower. He competed at the 1948 Summer Olympics in London with the men's coxed four where they were eliminated in the semi-final.

References

External links

1923 births
1996 deaths
Italian male rowers
Olympic rowers of Italy
Rowers at the 1948 Summer Olympics
Sportspeople from Bergamo
European Rowing Championships medalists